Mark Smith (born August 28, 1974 in Vicksburg, Mississippi) is a former American football defensive tackle in the National Football League. He was drafted by the Arizona Cardinals in the seventh round of the 1997 NFL Draft. He played college football at Auburn.

Smith also played for the Cleveland Browns.

1974 births
Living people
American football defensive tackles
American football defensive ends
Navarro Bulldogs football players
Hinds Eagles football players
Auburn Tigers football players
Arizona Cardinals players
Cleveland Browns players